The 35th Primetime Emmy Awards were held on September 25, 1983. The ceremony was broadcast on NBC, from the Pasadena Civic Auditorium, Pasadena, California.  It is remembered for the vulgar language during the ceremony, much of it from Joan Rivers who cohosted the ceremony with Eddie Murphy.  Rivers also wore nine dresses throughout the ceremony.

Despite being one of the lowest-rated shows of the season, the critically acclaimed first season of Cheers won Outstanding Comedy Series as well as three other major awards. For the third straight year, Hill Street Blues won Outstanding Drama Series, it received at least 14 major nominations for the third straight year, unprecedented at the time, and also received every nomination in the Outstanding Writing in a Drama Series field. Second City Television also garnered every nomination in a category, for Outstanding Writing in a Variety, Music or Comedy Program. NBC dominated the night, on the strength of the shows mentioned, it received 71 of the 128 major nominations, and won 19 of 25 major categories.

In its final ceremony, M*A*S*H was once again nominated for Outstanding Comedy Series. M*A*S*H was nominated every year it was on the air, 11/11, winning once in 1974, this record would be tied by Cheers a decade later when it too went 11/11, finishing with four victories.

Winners and nominees

Programs

Acting

Lead performances

Supporting performances

Directing

Writing

Most major nominations
By network 
 NBC – 71
 ABC – 23
 CBS – 22

 By program
 Hill Street Blues (NBC) – 14
 Fame (NBC) /Cheers (NBC) /The Thorn Birds (ABC) – 9
 Second City Television (NBC) / St. Elsewhere (NBC) – 7
 M*A*S*H (CBS) / Taxi (NBC) – 6

Most major awards
By network 
 NBC – 19
 ABC – 4
 CBS – 1

 By program
 Cheers (NBC) – 4
 Hill Street Blues (NBC) / St. Elsewhere (NBC) / Taxi (NBC) / The Thorn Birds (ABC) – 3
 Fame (NBC) – 2

Notes

References

External links
 Emmys.com list of 1983 Nominees & Winners
 

035
1983 television awards
1983 in California
September 1983 events in the United States